Deborah Susan Levy is a New Zealand business academic specialising in property and real estate.

Academic career
After an undergraduate at the University of Aberdeen, Levy wrote a PhD thesis Conceptualising the influence of clients on valuations at the University of Auckland. She has been a full professor at that institution in 2015.

Levy is a Fellow of the Royal Institution of Chartered Surveyors (FRICS) and was given a lifetime achievement award in 2017.

Selected works 
 Levy, Deborah S., and Christina Kwai-Choi Lee. "The influence of family members on housing purchase decisions." Journal of Property Investment & Finance 
 Levy, Deborah S. "Modern marketing research techniques and the property professional." Property management (journal) 13, no. 3 (1995): 33–40.

References

External links
 
 institutional homepage

Living people
Academic staff of the University of Auckland
New Zealand women academics
Business educators
Fellows of the Royal Institution of Chartered Surveyors
Year of birth missing (living people)
New Zealand women writers